John Alexander Duha (February 16, 1875 in Chicago, Illinois – January 21, 1940 in Chicago, Illinois) was an American gymnast and track and field athlete who competed in the 1904 Summer Olympics. In 1904 he won the bronze medals in the parallel bars event and team competition.

In the 1904 Summer Olympics he participated in the following events:

 Gymnastics combined - fourth place
 Gymnastics triathlon - 22nd place
 Gymnastics  all-around - 24th place
 Athletics triathlon - 36th place
 Horizontal bar - result unknown
 Vault - result unknown
 Pommel horse - result unknown

References

Sources

External links

 
 

1875 births
1940 deaths
American male artistic gymnasts
Olympic track and field athletes of the United States
Athletes (track and field) at the 1904 Summer Olympics
Gymnasts at the 1904 Summer Olympics
Olympic bronze medalists for the United States in gymnastics
Medalists at the 1904 Summer Olympics
American male triathletes
19th-century American people
20th-century American people
Track and field athletes from Chicago